Franklin Regional School District is a midsized, suburban public school district located in Murrysville, Pennsylvania, serving Murrysville and the neighboring communities of Delmont and Export. According to 2020 federal census data, it serves a resident population of 19,438 people. According to District officials, in school year 2021-22, Franklin Regional School District provided basic educational services to 3,555 pupils through the employment of 249 teachers, 152 full-time and part-time support personnel, and 19 administrators.

On April 9, 2014, a mass stabbing incident occurred at the Franklin Regional High School in which 24 people were injured, some of them seriously.

School campus 
The school district consists of four buildings: Franklin Regional High School (grades 9–12), Franklin Regional Middle School (grades 6–8), Franklin Regional Intermediate School (grades 3–5), and Franklin Regional Primary School (grades K–2). All buildings except for the Primary and Intermediate schools are situated on the school's main campus at the intersection of School Road and Old William Penn Highway in Murrysville.

Prior to the 2021-22 school year, students in grades K-5 attended one of three schools, Newlonsburg Elementary School, Heritage Elementary School, or Sloan Elementary School, of which all but Sloan were on the main campus. In October 2018, a project was passed by the Murrysville Council to renovate Sloan into a school for grades K-2 (FR Primary School) and to create a nearby new school for grades 3-5 (FR Intermediate School). Construction began in July of 2019, and students began attending at the start of the 2021-22 school year. There are plans to raze Heritage Elementary School, which contains the Administration Offices, and maybe turn Newlonsburg into the new Administration Offices. These plans have been delayed due to a finding of asbestos in Heritage's ceilings.

The school's campus at one time also extended to additional schools: Sardis Elementary School in Sardis, Delmont Elementary School in Delmont, White Valley Elementary School in White Valley, and Duff Elementary in Export. The Delmont and Duff school buildings are still standing and have been repurposed for other uses (the Delmont building houses the town library). White Valley Elementary was torn down in the late 1980s and the site is now a playground.

Extracurricular activities and achievements 
Franklin Regional School District offers a wide variety of extracurricular activities, clubs, and athletic programs that are available to all students in Grade 7 through 12.

Athletics
 In 1979, the Franklin Regional girls' basketball team won the state championship over J. P. McCaskey High School 68–42. The 1997 boys' basketball team was the runner-up for the state championship, losing the championship game 50-45 to Plymouth-Whitemarsh High School.
 In wrestling, Franklin Regional was the WPIAL Runner-Up in 2013 and placed 3rd place in the State Championship.  In 2014, Franklin Regional won the WPIAL championship and PIAA championship.  In 2015, Franklin Regional won WPIAL and PIAA championships.
 In Boys Golf, Franklin Regional won the 2020 WPIAL championship. 
 In wrestling, Franklin Regional won the 2015 WPIAL championship.
 In baseball, Franklin Regional won the WPIAL championship in 2001 at PNC Park, defeating Mt. Lebanon High School 11-9.
 In baseball, Franklin Regional won the WPIAL championship in 1997 and in 2021
 In girls lacrosse, Franklin Regional won the WPIAL championship in 2010.
 In girls volleyball, Franklin Regional won the WPIAL championship in 2020
 In football, Franklin Regional won the AAA Pennsylvania state championship and WPIAL championship in 2005, defeating Pottsville Area High School 23-13.  They also won the WPIAL title in 2005.
 In Boys Soccer, Franklin Regional won the WPIAL title in 2018 and 2019
 In softball, Franklin Regional won WPIAL titles in 1972 and 2009
 In boys lacrosse, Franklin Regional won WPSLA titles in 1995, 1996, 1999
 In girls basketball, Franklin Regional won WPIAL titles in 1977 and 1979.
 In girls golf, Franklin Regional won the WPIAL title in 1976.
 Football Section Champions - 1995, 1998, 2004, 2005, 2006, 2009, 2011, 2013, 2014, 2022
 Softball Section Champions - 1973, 1974, 1999, 2000, 2005, 2006, 2009, 2010, 2011, 2012, 2016, 2018
 Boys Swimming Section Champions - 1972, 1980, 1981, 1982, 1984, 1985, 1986, 1987, 1991, 1992, 1996, 1997, 1998, 1999, 2000, 2001, 2007, 2008, 2009, 2010, 2011, 2012, 2013, 2017, 2019, 2020, 2023
 Girls Swimming Sections Champions - 1971, 1973, 1975, 1981, 1990, 1991, 1992, 1993, 1994, 1995, 1996, 1997, 1998, 1999, 2003, 2004, 2007, 2008, 2009, 2010, 2011, 2012, 2014, 2015, 2016, 2018, 2019
 Boys Tennis Section Champions - 1978, 1979, 1980, 1984, 1985, 1989, 1998, 1995, 1997, 2002, 2003, 2004, 2005, 2006, 2007, 2008, 2009, 2010, 2014, 2016, 2018, 2019, 2021, 2022
 Girls Tennis Section Champions - 1974, 1975, 1976, 1977, 1978, 1979, 1980, 1981, 1989, 1991, 1994, 1997, 2007, 2012, 2015, 2022
 Boys Golf Section Champions - 1962, 1964, 1966, 1969, 1970, 1971, 1972, 1973, 1974, 1975, 1976, 1977, 1979, 1980, 1984, 1986, 1988, 1990, 2001, 2002, 2003, 2014, 2020
 Girls Golf Section Champions - 1975, 1976, 1977, 2003, 2020, 2021, 2022
 Boys Basketball Section Champions - 1997, 2008, 2018
 Girls Basketball Section Champions - 1970, 1971, 1972, 1973, 1974, 1975, 1976, 1977, 1978, 1979
 Baseball Section Champions - 1962, 1973, 1982, 1993, 1994, 1995, 1996, 2000, 2001, 2002, 2004, 2006, 2019, 2021
 Cross Country Section Champions - 1975, 1977, 1989, 1996, 2003, 2012, 2013, 2014
 Boys Lacrosse Section Champions - 2009
 Girls Track - 2015, 2016, 2018, 2022
 Girls Lacrosse Section Champions - 2001, 2003, 2006, 2007, 2008, 2010, 2017
 Boys Soccer Section Champions - 1983, 1984, 1985, 2007, 2008, 2014, 2017, 2018, 2019, 2020, 2021, 2022
 Girls Soccer Section Champions - 2003, 2004, 2007, 2011, 2014, 2016, 2021
 Wrestling Section Champions - 2013, 2014, 2015, 2023
 High School Hockey - Pennsylvania High School Hockey Championships - Penguins Cup Finalists Class AA - 1992, 1993, 1994, 1995, 2008, 2021, 2022 and Class AAA - 2003. Penguins Cup Champions - 2016, 2017.
 Boys Bowling Section Champions - 2017, 2018, 2019, 2020, 2023
 Boys Bowling WPIBL Champions - 2018, 2019, 2020
 Boys Track - 1975, 1977, 1979, 1980, 1984, 2017, 2018, 2019, 2022
 Girls Volleyball - 2019, 2021
 Boys Basketball - Founded 2006 - Rettger Memorial Tournament Champions: 2007, 2008, 2009, 2013, 2014, 2015, 2016, 2018, 2019, 2022

Arts
 The marching band participated in the Macy's Thanksgiving Day Parade in 2003, 2009 and 2019. It was also in the 2012 and 2016 Tournament of Roses Parade. The band also participated in the 2017 Presidential inaugural parade.

Notable alumni 
Julie Benz, actress
Thomas Costa, class of 2005, professional fighter
 Courtney Hazlett, gossip columnist for MSNBC and msnbc.com
 Sean Hickey – American football player
 Spencer Lee Multi-year World and NCAA Championship wrestler at University of Iowa
 John F. Meier – U.S. Navy aviator and rear admiral 
 Bob Moose, former Major League Baseball pitcher 
 Manu Narayan, actor
 Tom Ricketts, former NFL offensive lineman
Maddie Ziegler, dancer featured on Dance Moms; attended Sloan Elementary before moving to California.
Mackenzie Ziegler, dancer featured on Dance Moms; attended Sloan Elementary before moving to California.

References

External links
Franklin Regional School District's webpage

School districts established in 1962
School districts in Westmoreland County, Pennsylvania
Education in Pittsburgh area
1962 establishments in Pennsylvania